Roderick Wayne Jones (born March 31, 1964 in Dallas, Texas) is a former professional American football cornerback who was selected by the Tampa Bay Buccaneers in the 1st round (25th overall) of the 1986 NFL Draft. A 1982 graduate of South Oak Cliff High School and former player for Southern Methodist University, Jones played in 11 seasons for the Bucs and Cincinnati Bengals from 1986 to 1996. At SMU, he was an All-American in the 400 meters, and won national titles with the 1,600-meter relay team in 1984 and 1986. The latter occurred only four days before his report to Buccaneers training camp. He won SMU's Big Hit award in his last two football seasons, where he was nicknamed "K.O." for his hard-hitting play. He was later named as one of the players who had received slush-fund money in the scandal that resulted in SMU receiving the "death penalty" from the NCAA.

Jones was the first of the 1986 first-round draft picks to sign with his team. There was concern that his contract, described as "terrible" by sports agents, would set a bad precedent in negotiations that year. It featured a high signing bonus and a salary far below the previous year's average. He was inserted immediately into the Bucs' starting lineup as a rookie. In his professional career, he appeared in 146 games, intercepting 10 passes for 49 yards.

Jones' claim to fame is having caught Bo Jackson, who appeared to have a touchdown, from behind after an 88-yard run in 1990.

References

1964 births
Living people
American football cornerbacks
Tampa Bay Buccaneers players
Cincinnati Bengals players
SMU Mustangs football players